Syllepte patagialis is a moth in the family Crambidae. It was described by Zeller in 1852. It is found in Cameroon, the Democratic Republic of Congo (Bas Congo, North Kivu), South Africa and on the Comoros.

References

Moths described in 1852
patagialis
Taxa named by Philipp Christoph Zeller
Moths of Africa